For the Fans is a 2000 exclusive limited collection of three separate enhanced music CDs and a VHS from the Backstreet Boys that was promoted and distributed through Burger King restaurants in August 2000 with the purchase of any value meal.

Each of the three music CDs features the song "It's True" later released on the group's fourth studio album Black & Blue along with previously unreleased live recordings from the band's Into the Millennium Tour at the Conseco Fieldhouse in Indianapolis, Indiana. The VHS video includes live performances, promo videos and exclusive behind the scenes footage.

Track listing

References

Backstreet Boys albums
2000 EPs
2000 video albums
2000 live albums
Live video albums
Live EPs